Maksym Yaroslavovych Khimchak (born 13 February 2000) is a Ukrainian professional football midfielder who plays for FC Lviv.

Career
Khimchak is a product of the Lviv youth sportive school.

He played for FC Veres and FC Lviv in the Ukrainian Premier League Reserves and in January 2019 Khimchak was promoted to the senior squad of the last team. He made his debut in the Ukrainian Premier League for FC Lviv as a substituted on 30 May 2019, playing in a lost match against FC Shakhtar Donetsk.

References

External links 

2000 births
Living people
Ukrainian footballers
Association football midfielders
FC Lviv players
FC Vovchansk players
Ukrainian Premier League players
Ukrainian Second League players